The Executive Office of the President of the Republic of Indonesia is a non-structural government agency directly under the auspices of the President of Indonesia. The office reports to the President and is headed by a Chief of Staff. Previously, the office was named Unit of Presidential Staff (Unit Staf Kepresidenan) based on the Presidential Decree No.29/ 2014. The current name has been used based on the Presidential Decree No.26/2015 dated 23 February 2015 due to the expansion of the task and function assigned to the office.

Tasks and Functions 
The Republic of Indonesia's Presidential Executive Office has the primary task to support and assist the President and Vice President of Indonesia in controlling, managing, and ensuring the realization of national priority programs as well as political and strategic affairs management. In order to perform such tasks, the President's executive office are assigned the following functions:
 To manage national priority programs, to ensure the programs are aligned with the President's vision and mission;
 To provide support in acceleration of national priority programs and strategic issues;
 To monitor and evaluate the execution of national priority programs and strategic issues;
 To handle comprehensive dispute resolutions on any national priority programs which encounter any obstacle/problem/dispute;
 To manage strategic issues;
 To manage communication strategy of the President and Vice President;
 To manage political communication strategy and disseminate information;
 To provide data and information analysis for strategic decision making;
 To execute administrative duty of the Executive Office of the President;
 To execute other functions as assigned by the President.

Organization Structure 
The Executive Office of the President consists of:

Executives 
 Chief of Staff for the President, who heads the executive office and directly responsible to the president; and
 Vice Chief of Staff for the President, who assists the Chief of Staff in executing the duties of the executive office.

Deputies 
 Deputy Chief of Staff for Infrastructure, Energy, and Investment;
 Deputy Chief of Staff for Human Development;
 Deputy Chief of Staff for Economic Affairs;
 Deputy Chief of Staff for Information and Political Communication;
 Deputy Chief of Staff for Politics, Law, Defense, Security, and Human Rights.

Advisors 
 Special Advisor for Infrastructure, Energy, and Investment;
 Special Advisor for Human Development;
 Special Advisor for Economic Affairs;
 Special Advisor for Information and Political Communication;
 Special Advisor for Politics, Law, Defense, Security and Human Rights.

Staffs / Advisors 
The Professional Staffs / Advisors work directly under the coordination of the deputies. The Staffs / Advisors consist of:

 Senior Advisors, Equivalent To Echelon I.b
 Advisors, Equivalent To Echelon II.a
 Assistant Advisors, Equivalent To Echelon III.a
 Technical And Administrative Assistant

Secretariat 
The Secretariat of The Executive Office of The President is headed by The Head of Secretariat who is a career civil servant. Even though the secretariat works under the Chief of Staff to the President to run the administrative aspect of the Office, the secretariat consists of civil servants coordinated and administered by the Ministry of State Secretariat.

List of Chief of Staff for the President

References

Government of Indonesia